ORP Komendant Piłsudski was a  originally built at Ab Crichton in Turku, Finland, for the Imperial Russian Navy. She was bought by the Polish Navy in 1920 and served until scuttled in the Invasion of Poland on September 30, 1939.

Raised by the Germans, she was subsequently renamed Heisternest (M 3109) and served in the Kriegsmarine. Heisternest was sunk in a U.S. bomb raid in Nantes, France, on September 16, 1943.

References

1917 ships
Ships built in Turku
Ships built in the Russian Empire
Naval ships of Poland
Maritime incidents in September 1939
Scuttled vessels
Naval ships of Poland captured by Germany during World War II
Maritime incidents in September 1943
Ships sunk by US aircraft
Shipwrecks of Poland